The 1947 World Table Tennis Championships men's singles was the 14th edition of the men's singles championship. 

Bohumil Váňa defeated Ferenc Sidó in the final, winning three sets to nil to secure the title.

Results

+ Time limit rule

See also
List of World Table Tennis Championships medalists

References

-